Eriswell is a village and civil parish of West Suffolk in the English county of Suffolk.

About forty scattered archaeological finds have been made here, including Bronze Age battle axes, palstaves and rapiers. The greater part of these objects have been entrusted to the Moyse's Hall Museum in Bury St Edmunds while other items are in the Museum of Archaeology and Anthropology in Cambridge.

See also
 Forest Heath - civil parishes

References

External links

Villages in Suffolk
Forest Heath
Civil parishes in Suffolk